Joan Redmond (born 1946) is an American photographer.

Her work is included in the collection of the National Gallery of Canada, the Museum of Contemporary Photography, the Norton Simon Museum and in the Art Institute of Chicago.

References

1946 births
Living people
20th-century American photographers
20th-century American women photographers
21st-century American women